Yazdan-e Mahallah (also Romanized as Yazdān-e Maḩallah) is a village in Chaharkuh Rural District, in the Central District of Kordkuy County, Golestan Province, Iran.

Population
At the 2006 census, its population was 87, in 36 families.

References 

Populated places in Kordkuy County
Populated places in Iran